Xylophanes chiron is a moth of the family Sphingidae first described by Dru Drury in 1771.

Distribution 
It can be found in Mexico down to northern Argentina and in Guadeloupe, Martinique and Jamaica.

Description 
The wingspan range is 77–81 mm.

Biology 
The larvae feed on Rubiaceae species.

Subspecies
Xylophanes chiron chiron
Xylophanes chiron cubanus Rothschild & Jordan, 1906 (Cuba)
Xylophanes chiron lucianus Rothschild & Jordan, 1906 (Dominica)
Xylophanes chiron nechus (Cramer, 1777) (Brazil)

References

External links
Xylophanes chiron Sphingidae of the Americas

chiron
Moths described in 1771
Sphingidae of South America
Moths of South America
Taxa named by Dru Drury